Bahmani or Behmani, in Iran, may refer to:
 Bahmani, Fasa, Fars Province
 Bahmani, Larestan, Fars Province
 Bahmani, Sepidan, Fars Province
 Bahmani, Bandar Lengeh, Hormozgan Province
 Bahmani, Minab, Hormozgan Province
 Bahmani, Markazi